Leroy Bernard "Pat" Hanley (August 21, 1896 – July 20, 1966) was an American football player and coach.  He served as the head football coach at Boston University from 1934 to 1941, compiling a record of 35–24–5.  A native of Spokane, Washington, Hanley played college football at Washington State University as an end from 1916 to 1917, alongside his brother, Dick Hanley.  Pat was the line coach at Haskell Institute and at Northwestern University under his brother.  Hanley served as United States Marine Corps officer during World War II.  He was promoted to lieutenant colonel in 1943.

Head coaching record

References

External links
 

1896 births
1966 deaths
American football ends
Boston University Terriers football coaches
Haskell Indian Nations Fighting Indians football coaches
Northwestern Wildcats football coaches
Washington State Cougars football players
United States Marine Corps colonels
United States Marine Corps personnel of World War II
Players of American football from Spokane, Washington